Gymnocalycium denudatum is a species of Gymnocalycium from Brazil.

References

External links
 
 

denudatum
Flora of Brazil